The North Jersey Tri-County Conference was a high school athletic conference in New Jersey, created by the New Jersey State Interscholastic Athletic Association (NJSIAA) as a holding conference. The NJTCC consisted of 45 public and non-public schools in Bergen, Passaic and Hudson counties, and existed for the 2009–2010 academic year.

The North Jersey Tri-County Conference should not be confused with the Tri-County Conference, located in Camden, Cape May, Cumberland, Gloucester and Salem counties, which was first established in 1928 and continues in existence today.

History
As high school athletics in New Jersey grew in the 1990s and 2000s, problems began to develop in the organization of leagues and conferences. Transportation costs began to grow, as some conferences had teams from as many as four different counties competing against each other. Other conferences were losing competitive balance, as a growth in non-public school enrollment and athletic programs caused tension between non-public and public schools, with public schools accusing non-public schools of recruiting. Conferences also demanded more flexibility in scheduling, as schools felt locked into league and division schedules against opponents either too weak or too strong for true competitive balance.

The strongest tensions were found in the Northern New Jersey Interscholastic League, where public schools, who were frustrated by the competitive imbalance with non-public schools, especially Don Bosco Preparatory (Ramsey) and Bergen Catholic (Oradell) in football or Immaculate Heart Academy (Township of Washington) in girls' athletics, threatened to secede from the league.

Therefore, in 2008 the NJSIAA established a "Leagues and Conferences Realignment Committee" to discuss the need for realigning conferences and leagues throughout New Jersey. Their original proposal for schools in northern New Jersey was the creation of six super conferences from the eleven conferences then in existence. While the original proposal was not accepted as presented, it was adjusted and schools realigned yet again, to create the current system in place in New Jersey athletics.

The North Jersey Tri-County Conference served as a mega conference during the one-year transition period (2009-2010) before statewide realignment, and in many ways was simply a clearinghouse for logistical and competitive balance while the NJSIAA and its member schools continued to debate the realignment process. It incorporated teams from the Northern New Jersey Interscholastic League, Northern Hills Conference, North Bergen Interscholastic Athletic League and the Hudson County Interscholastic Athletic Association, which went on hiatus during the 2009–2010 season.

When realignment was agreed to, the NJTCC was disbanded in favor of its successor conferences, the Big North Conference, the North Jersey Interscholastic Conference and the reconstituted Hudson County Interscholastic Athletic Association.

Former Member Schools

Bergen County Public Schools

 Bergen County Technical High School - Hackensack
 Fair Lawn High School - Fair Lawn
 Hackensack High School - Hackensack
 Paramus High School - Paramus
 Ridgewood High School - Ridgewood
 Teaneck High School – Teaneck

Bergen County Non-Public Schools

 Bergen Catholic High School - Oradell
 Don Bosco Preparatory High School - Ramsey
 Immaculate Heart Academy - Washington Township, New Jersey
 Saint Joseph Regional High School - Montvale

Passaic County Public Schools

 Clifton High School - Clifton
 Eastside High School - Paterson
 John F. Kennedy High School - Paterson
 Lakeland Regional High School - Wanaque
 Passaic County Technical Institute - Wayne
 Passaic High School - Passaic
 Passaic Valley High School - Little Falls
 Wayne Hills High School – Wayne
 Wayne Valley High School - Wayne
 West Milford High School - West Milford

Passaic County Non-Public Schools

 DePaul Catholic High School - Wayne

Hudson County Public Schools

 Bayonne High School - Bayonne
 Create Charter High School - Jersey City (closed in 2010)
 Dr. Ronald E. McNair Academic High School - Jersey City
 Ferris High School - Jersey City
 High Tech High School - North Bergen
 Hoboken High School - Hoboken
 County Prep High School - Jersey City
 Kearny High School - Kearny
 Lincoln High School - Jersey City
 Memorial High School - West New York
 North Bergen High School - North Bergen
 Snyder High School - Jersey City
 Union City High School - Union City
 University Academy Charter High School – Jersey City
 William L. Dickinson High School - Jersey City

Hudson County Non-Public Schools

 Holy Family Academy - Bayonne
 Hudson Catholic Regional High School - Jersey City
 Kearny Christian Academy - Kearny
 Marist High School - Bayonne
 Saint Anthony High School - Jersey City
 Saint Dominic Academy - Jersey City
 Saint Mary High School - Jersey City
 Saint Peter's Preparatory High School - Jersey City

Sports Offered

Fall Sports

 Cross Country
 Field Hockey
 Football
 Gymnastics
 Soccer
 Tennis (Girls)
 Volleyball (Girls)

Winter Sports 

 Basketball (Boys)
 Basketball (Girls)
 Bowling
 Ice Hockey
 Swimming
 Winter Track
 Wrestling

Spring Sports 

 Baseball
 Golf
 Lacrosse
 Softball
 Tennis (Boys)
 Track & Field
 Volleyball (Boys)

References

New Jersey high school athletic conferences
Sports in Bergen County, New Jersey
Passaic County, New Jersey
Sports in Hudson County, New Jersey